The 11th Parliament of Sri Lanka was a meeting of the Parliament of Sri Lanka, with the membership determined by the results of the 2000 parliamentary election held on 10 October 2000. The parliament met for the first time on 18 October 2000 and was dissolved on 10 October 2001.

Election

The 11th parliamentary election was held on 10 October 2000. The incumbent People's Alliance (PA) became the largest group in Parliament by winning 107 of the 225 seats. The United National Party (UNP), the main opposition party, won 89 seats. The Janatha Vimukthi Peramuna (JVP) won 10 seats and smaller parties won the remaining 19 seats.

Results

The new parliament was sworn in on 18 October 2000. Opposition MP Anura Bandaranaike was elected Speaker unopposed. Sarath Moonesinghe was elected Deputy Speaker and Lalith Dissanayake was elected Deputy Chairman of Committees.

Government

The PA was able to form a government with the support of the four NUA MPs elected under their party's name (the NUA contested with the PA in two districts and under its name in all other districts) and the four EPDP MPs.

On 13 October 2000, President Chandrika Kumaratunga re-appointed Ratnasiri Wickremanayake as Prime Minister. The rest of the government, comprising 40 Ministers, were sworn in on 19 October 2000. President Kumaratunga retained control of the important ministries of Defence and Finance. 35 Deputy Ministers were sworn in on 3 November 2000.

A political crisis engulfed the 11th parliament in the middle of 2001 as numerous PA MPs defected to the opposition (see section below). Faced with losing a no confidence vote President Kumaratunga dissolved parliament on 10 October 2001.

Changes in party/alliance affiliations
The 11th parliament saw the following defections:
20 June 2001: Sri Lanka Muslim Congress/National Unity Alliance (11 MPs) quits PA after its leader Rauff Hakeem is dismissed from the government. This leaves the PA government without a majority in parliament.
9 October 2001: One MEP MP (Bandula Gunawardane) crosses over to the opposition.
10 October 2001: Eight SLFP MPs (S. B. Dissanayake, Wijepala Mendis, Ananda Moonesinghe, Bandula Nanayakkara, G. L. Peiris, Ediriweera Premaratna, Jayasundara Wijekoon and Mahinda Wijesekara) cross over to the opposition.
10 October 2001: Ceylon Workers' Congress (four MPs) quits PA.

Deaths and resignations
The 11th parliament saw the following deaths and resignations:
November 2000: S. B. Nawinne (PA-KUR) resigned to become Chief Minister of the North Western Province. His replacement T. B. Ekanayake (PA-KUR) was sworn in on 9 November 2000.
14 November 2000: Mahinda Yapa Abeywardena (PA-MTR) resigned to become Chief Minister of the Southern Province.

Members

References
 
 
 
 

Parliament of Sri Lanka
2000 Sri Lankan parliamentary election